Nawab Ayaz Khan Jogezai (Born 28 January 1959) is the Pashtun Nawab. He became Nawab after the death of Nawab Taimoor Shah Khan Jogezai. While he was still alive, Nawab Taimoor Shah Khan Jogezai nominated Nawab Mohammad Ayaz Khan Jogezai as the next Nawab. He survived an assassination attempt at Killa Saifullah in 1988 but was seriously injured. On the request of the Chairman of Pashtunkhwa Milli Awami Party, Mahmood Khan Achakzai, he joined the party for the unity of all Pashtuns. He was elected as a member of the National Assembly of Pakistan for NA-200 (Zhob-cum-Killa Saifullah in 1993 till 1996. He also remained a member of the Senate of Pakistan from 2003 to 2009. He contested for PB-3 (Quetta-III) constituency in the  2013 Balochistan provincial election and was successful. He was appointed Provincial Minister of Balochistan for Public Health and Engineering Department in 2013 and remained in office till 2018.

He is the convener of Pashtun Ulasi Qaumi Jirga ("Pashtun National Council"). The Jirga was held in March 1998 and was attended by the majority of tribal elders throughout Southern Pashtunkhwa (a heavily Pashtun populated area of Balochistan).

He participated in a Peace Jirga commissioned by Afghan President Hamid Karzai in late 2008. In Kabul, Nawab Jogezai had a series of meetings to discuss Pashtun unity with Asfandyar Wali Khan, Mahmood Khan Achakzai and President Karzai.He has good relation with Pashtun tribal leader Zafar Habib Kudezai.

From 11 to 14 March 2022, he was part of the Pashtun National Jirga, which was held in Bannu, Khyber Pakhtunkhwa to discuss the critical issues faced by the Pashtuns in Pakistan and Afghanistan.

References

Living people
Pashtun people
Members of the Senate of Pakistan
Pashtunkhwa Milli Awami Party politicians
1959 births